Chun is a district (amphoe) of Phayao province in northern Thailand.

History
Chun District dates back to an ancient city named Wiang Lo, which is of similar age as Mueang Phayao.

Geography
Neighboring districts are (from the east clockwise): Chiang Kham, Pong and Dok Khamtai of Phayao Province, Pa Daet and Thoeng of Chiang Rai province.

The important water resources are the Ing and Chun Rivers.

Administration
The district is divided into seven sub-districts (tambons), which are further subdivided into 88 villages (mubans). Huai Khao Kam is a township (thesaban tambon) covering parts of tambon Huai Khao Kam. There are a further six tambon administrative organization (TAO).

References

External links
amphoe.com (Thai)

Chun